Gavia Pass (el. 2621 m.) is a high mountain pass in the Italian Alps. It is the tenth highest paved road in the Alps.

The pass lies in the Lombardy region and divides the province of Sondrio to the north and the province of Brescia to the south. The road over the pass (SS 300) connects Bormio to the northwest with Ponte di Legno to the south and is single track most on its southern section.

Climbing around Gavia Pass
There are many peaks to climb around. Directly above the pass on its east side is Corno dei Tre Signori (3360 m) and next to it Monte Gaviola (3025). On the other side of the road raises Monte Gavia (3223 m). By continuing along the road in the direction of Bormio, after less than 3 km, one arrives at the monument from where routes start for the Punta San Matteo (3678 m) group. The group includes Pizo Tresero (3594 m), Punta Pendranzini (3599), Cima Dosegu (3560) and several others.

Huts
There are several huts around. Rifugio Bonetta is directly on the Pass, and very close to the monument is Rifugio A. Berni. High in the mountains one finds Bivacco Seveso at 3398 m, directly below the summit of Tresero. Yet another refuge below Cima di val Umbrina (3220) is Bivacco Battaglione Ortles at 3122 m.

Giro d'Italia
The Gavia Pass is often on the route of the Giro d'Italia road bicycle race and is sometimes designated the Cima Coppi, the highest point of the race. On 5 June 1988, the race passed over the Gavia in a snowstorm, making for an epic stage won by Erik Breukink. American Andrew Hampsten, the second-place finisher, became the overall race leader and went on to win the Giro.

Appearances in Giro d'Italia (since 1960)

Gallery

See also
 List of highest paved roads in Europe
 List of mountain passes

External links

Profile on climbbybike.com
Map, photos, cycling profile for both sides

Gavia Pass
Gavia